Gnophodes chelys, the dusky evening brown or lobed evening brown, is a butterfly in the family Nymphalidae. It is found in Sierra Leone, Liberia, Ivory Coast, Ghana, Togo, Nigeria, Cameroon, Gabon, the Republic of the Congo, Angola, the Central African Republic, the Democratic Republic of the Congo, Uganda, western Kenya and western Tanzania. The habitat consists of dense forests.

Both sexes are attracted to fermented bananas.

The larvae feed on Setaria (including S. barbatus and S. megaphylla) and Pennisetum species (including P. purpureum), as well as Olyra latifolia, Rottboellia exaltata, Imperata cylindrica, and Streprogyna crinita.

References

Seitz, A. Die Gross-Schmetterlinge der Erde 13: Die Afrikanischen Tagfalter. Plate XIII 26

Butterflies described in 1793
Melanitini
Taxa named by Johan Christian Fabricius